Inkle may refer to:

 Inkle (character), a character in the comic opera Inkle and Yarico
 Inkle (company), a British video game company
 Inkle (loom), a type of warp-faced weaving loom